AFC Whyteleafe is an English football club based in Whyteleafe, Surrey. The club was established in 2021 and plays at the Whyteleafe Stadium in Church Road, Whyteleafe following the demise of Whyteleafe FC and is currently a member of the Southern Counties East League Division One which sits at Step 6 of the National League System, Tier 10 of the English football pyramid.

History
AFC Whyteleafe was formed in 2021 by Kelly Waters, replacing another club, Whyteleafe FC, which had existed immediately before. Waters had hoped to purchase the Church Road premises before it was sold to Irama Sports in February 2021, but he discovered the auction a week too late, and the sale to Irama went through. Following the withdrawal of Whyteleafe FC from the Isthmian League, and inspired by the story of AFC Wimbledon in 2002, AFC Whyteleafe was born.

The new club was granted a position in the Surrey South Eastern Combination League for the 2021/22 season, having formed a merge of registration with Balham FC B Team. This still left the club with less than one month to build a squad from scratch, ready for their debut match on 4th September 2021 at home to Earlsfield 2018. 

A crucial part of the successful formation of the club was securing a ground. Church Road was the preferred choice and a 4-year deal was reached with Irama to play at what is considered the spiritual home of football in Whyteleafe. 

Following a successful first season, AFC Whyteleafe merged with Whyteleafe Youth FC and Whyteleafe Women ahead of the 2022/23 season to form one AFC Whyteleafe club comprising a men's first team, U23's, women's team and 28 Youth teams from U7 to U18.

In May 2022, the club was admitted into the Southern Counties East League Division One which sits at Step 6 in the National League System.

Ground

AFC Whyteleafe play their home games at Church Road, Whyteleafe, Surrey, CR3 0AR.

The site of Church Road was formerly farmland, and the farm's existing buildings were converted into the clubhouse and dressing rooms. Whyteleafe FC originally planned to add a running track and cricket pitch to the complex, but these plans were abandoned. Floodlights were added in the early 1980s and a new main stand added in 1999 for the club's first round FA Cup match against Chester City, which saw a record attendance of 2,164. Some of the turnstiles added at the ground were purchased from Stoke City's Victoria Ground after they moved to the Britannia Stadium in 1997.

In June 2021, following the purchase of the ground by Singaporean-based company Irama, Whyteleafe FC left Church Road due to no agreement being reached with Irama for a new lease with the club.

In August 2021 a new club, AFC Whyteleafe, was formed under new management and a 4 year agreement was reached to play at Church Road.

Off the pitch Management

Team Management

Men's First Team Squad

Records
Men's first team:
Best League Performance: 2nd (Promoted) - Surrey South Eastern Combination League Intermediate Division One (2021/22)
Best SCEFL League Challenge Cup Performance: 2nd Round (2022/23)
Best FA Vase Performance: 2nd Round (2022/23)
Record Attendance: 515 v Wimbledon Casuals - Surrey South Eastern Combination League Intermediate Division One, 9th April 2022
Biggest Win: AFC Whyteleafe 7-1 Snodland Town - FA Vase First Round, 24th October 2022
Biggest Defeat: FC Tooting Bec Reserves 6-2 AFC Whyteleafe - Surrey South Eastern Combination League Intermediate Division One, 11th September 2021
Highest Scoring Match: AFC Whyteleafe 7-2 Kew Park Rangers - Surrey South Eastern Combination League Intermediate Division One, 18th September 2021
Most Appearances: 58 - Kane Orlebar
All-time Top Goalscorer: 28 - Joe Condon
Most Goals by a Player in a Season: 22 - Joe Condon (2021/22)
Most League Goals by a Player in a Season: 16 - Joe Condon (2021/22)
Most goals in a single match: 5 - Daniel Adjei vs. Bermondsey Town - SCEFL Division One, 10th December 2022

References

Association football clubs established in 2021
2021 establishments in England
Football clubs in England
Football clubs in Surrey
Surrey South Eastern Combination
Southern Counties East Football League